Eddie Younger was a former player for the New York Rens.  He is a member of the New York City Basketball Hall of Fame.  Younger attended Benjamin Franklin High School and later Long Island University.  Younger would also play for the Scranton Miners in the American Basketball League.

References

Year of birth missing
Year of death missing
American men's basketball players
LIU Brooklyn Blackbirds men's basketball players
New York Renaissance players